The third deputy prime minister of Spain, officially Third Vice President of the Government of Spain, is a senior member of the Government of Spain. The office of the third deputy prime minister is not a permanent position, existing only at the discretion of the prime minister. It is a constitutional office because it is foreseen in the Constitution when it provides for the possibility of existing more than one vice presidency.

It rarely exists: three times in the last years of the Franco dictatorship and three times in the current democratic period (1977–1978; 2009–2011; and since 2020).

The office of third deputy prime minister does not possess special constitutional powers beyond its responsibility as a member of the Council of Ministers. The position is regulated in the Government Act of 1997 and it only specifies that the raison d'être of the office is to replace the prime minister when the office is vacant, or the premier is absence or ill. The third deputy prime minister only assume this responsibility if the first and second deputies could not do it.

History 
Like the position of second deputy prime minister, the office of third deputy prime minister was created in January 1974, although its legal framework dates back to the Organic Act of the State of 1967. The first person to hold this position was Licinio de la Fuente, who also held the Labour portfolio. De la Fuente distanced himself greatly from Prime Minister Arias Navarro, strongly criticizing that the position of third deputy PM was a symbolic position that did not possess any extra powers. This distancing increased when the prime minister refused to create a Government Delegated Committee to deal with social issues, a committee that De la Fuente wanted to chair. After many arguments with the government members and the Prime Minister, De la Fuente resigned on March 5, 1975.

De la Fuente was replaced by Fernando Suárez González as both Third Deputy and Labour Minister and he managed to pass the pending laws of De la Fuente. A few months later, Arias Navarro appointed Juan Miguel Villar Mir as Third Deputy, assuming also the portfolios of Economy and Finance.

Adolfo Suárez did not use this position until his second term, in 1977, appointing Third DPM to Fernando Abril Martorell. The official title of Abril Martorell was "Deputy Prime Minister for Political Affairs" responsible mainly for the relations between the Government and the Parliament.

The position was not used for more than 30 years, until 2009 when Prime Minister Zapatero appointed Manuel Chaves as Third DPM and Minister of Territorial Policy. Chaves left the office in 2011 when he was promoted to Second DPM.

The conservative PM Mariano Rajoy never used this position, and prime minister Pedro Sánchez did not use it in his first government, but he did it in the second one. Sánchez appointed economic affairs minister Nadia Calviño as Third DPM in 2020 until 2021, when she promoted her to Second DPM and appointed Labour Minister Yolanda Díaz as Third DPM.

List of officeholders
Office name:
Third Vice Presidency of the Government (1974–1975; 1977–1978; 2009–2011; 2020–present)
Vice Presidency of the Government for Economic Affairs (1975–1976)

See also
 Deputy Prime Minister of Spain
 Second Deputy Prime Minister of Spain
 Fourth Deputy Prime Minister of Spain

References

Lists of political office-holders in Spain
Deputy Prime Ministers of Spain